Judi Longfield,  (born April 23, 1947) is a former Canadian politician.  She was a member of the House of Commons of Canada from 1997 to 2006, representing the riding of Whitby—Oshawa as a member of the Liberal Party. She has also campaigned for the Legislative Assembly of Ontario.

Background
Longfield was born in Timmins, Ontario.  She graduated from North Bay Teacher's College, and worked as a community college teacher before taking time off to raise a family.  She was a governor of the Trafalgar Castle School for Girls.  Longfield began working for the Liberal Party in 1965 as an organizer, and was an executive assistant to Ontario Liberal Members of Provincial Parliament (MPPs) Allan Furlong and Steve Mahoney.  She was a field organizer in Jean Chrétien's 1990 leadership campaign, and co-managed Dalton McGuinty's bid to become provincial leader in 1996.

Politics
Longfield was elected to the Whitby municipal council in 1991, winning a close victory in the city's second ward.  She was re-elected in 1994.  Longfield was involved with the local government division of the National Democratic Institute in this period, and represented Canada on delegations to Romania and Guyana.

Longfield was designated as the Liberal candidate for Whitby—Ajax in the 1997 federal election, as part of an effort by Prime Minister Chrétien to increase the number of female Members of Parliament (MPs) in the Liberal caucus.  She won a convincing victory, and was returned in the 2000 and 2004 elections, fending off a strong challenge from the Conservative Party on the latter occasion.

Longfield served as parliamentary secretary to the Minister of Labour from 1999 to 2001 under Chrétien, and was parliamentary secretary to the Minister of Labour and Housing in Paul Martin's government from 2004 to 2006.  She also remained active with the Ontario Liberal Party, co-chairing that party's campaign in the 1999 provincial election.  Initially associated with the Chrétien wing of the Liberal Party, Longfield sided with supporters of Chrétien's rival Paul Martin during a key procedural vote in 2002.

Longfield was a supporter of pay equity policies, and criticized her own government for appealing a Supreme Court decision on the issue in 1998.  She was also a vocal proponent of affordable housing.

Longfield was defeated in the 2006 federal election by Conservative candidate Jim Flaherty, a former cabinet minister from the provincial government of Mike Harris.  Shortly thereafter, she was chosen as the Ontario Liberal Party candidate for Flaherty's vacated provincial seat in a provincial by-election held on March 30, 2006.  She finished a close second against Progressive Conservative candidate Christine Elliott, Flaherty's wife.

Electoral record

All federal electoral information is taken from Elections Canada.  Italicized expenditures from elections after 1997 refer to submitted totals, and are presented when the final reviewed totals are not available. Expenditures from 1997 refer to submitted totals.

References

Notes

Citations

External links

1947 births
Women members of the House of Commons of Canada
Liberal Party of Canada MPs
Living people
Members of the House of Commons of Canada from Ontario
Members of the King's Privy Council for Canada
Nipissing University alumni
People from Timmins
People from Whitby, Ontario
Women in Ontario politics
21st-century Canadian politicians
21st-century Canadian women politicians